The SuperSport Ladies Challenge is a women's professional golf tournament held in South Africa. It is an event on the Southern Africa-based Sunshine Ladies Tour since 2014 and has been played at the Gary Player Country Club in Sun City since 2020.

In 2022, Paula Reto secured her first professional title in her home country after a record ten stroke victory.

Winners

References

External links
Coverage on the Sunshine Tour's official site

Sunshine Ladies Tour events
Golf tournaments in South Africa